Thomas Guest may refer to:

 Thomas Guest (died 1807), British industrialist
 Thomas B. Guest (1816–1884), Ontario political figure
 Thomas Douglas Guest (1781–1845), British historical and portrait painter